Baxian may refer to:
Bāxiān 八仙, the  Eight Immortals
Bàxiān  霸先, the given name of the Emperor Wu of Chen
Baxian Tower 拔仙台, Mount Taibai
Baxian or Ba County, a former name of Bazhou City